Advanced Generation may refer to:

In real life
Vega (rocket) (also known as Advanced Generation European Carrier Rocket), an expandable launch system

In popular culture
The Advanced Generation arc of the Pokémon anime
Mobile Suit Gundam AGE, the AGE (Advanced Generation Era) arc of Gundam anime and manga series